Tompuri is a Finnish surname. Notable people with the surname include:

Elli Tompuri (1880–1962), Finnish actor, director, dancer, and author
Timo Tompuri (born 1969), Finnish discus thrower
Tuomo Tompuri (born 1976), Finnish mountain bike orienteering competitor

Finnish-language surnames